Afonso Dias is a Portuguese singer, musician, poet and actor.  He was deputy of the Constitution Assembly of 1975/76 under the Popular Democratic Union (Portugal) (later, he did not exercise in other political offices).  In music, he was one of the founders of Grupo de Acção Cultural (GAC, the Cultural Group Action).  He was elected in numerous presentation inside and outside Portugal, though he recorded different discs in the studio.  Throughout his career, he took part in artistic shows with José Afonso, Sérgio Godinho, Francisco Fanhais, Manuel Freire, Pedro Barroso, Tino Flores, José Fanha and others, he had edited several solo studio albums.  In theater, in the 1960s and the 1970s, he attended theatrical plays with Costa Ferreira, Carmen Dolores and Rogério Paulo.  He was the founded of Trupe Barlaventina - Jograis do Algarve in 1999, and performed numerous shows and made studio recordings.  He worked as a director-actor and actor (and singer), since 2003 with the A Companhia de Teagro de Algarve (ACTA, Algarve Theatre Company).  He was member of the Associação Música XXI (XXI Music Association) which had been recording several CD collections in Selecta.

Discography
O que vale a pena (1979)
Pela calada (1987)
Olhar de Pássaro (2000) (nominated for a José Afonso Award)
Na asa loira do Sol (2001)
Geometria do Sul (Southern Geometry), 2002
Abecedário a rimar (2003)
 "13" (2010)
Fado Aleixo (2013)
O mar ao fundo (2014)

As soloist
Cantando espalharey I, II e III (2002, 3 CDs with multimedia)
Selected (Selecta) Collections:
Poetas da Lusofonia, (Lusophony Poets), 2006
Poesia de António Gedeão, (Poems by António Gedeão) 2006)
Poesia de Alberto Caeiro – O Guardador de rebanhos (Poems by Alberto Caeiro, Keeper of the Flocks), 2006
Poesia de Cabo Verde e Sete Poemas de Sebastião da Gama (Poetry of Cape Verde and Seven Poems by Sebastião da Gama), 2007
Poesia de Miguel Torga, Poems by Miguel Torga, 2007
Poesia de Natália Correia (Poems by Natália Correia), 2007
Fernando Pessoa e Ricardo Reis (Fernando Pessoa and Ricardo Reis)
Álvaro de Campos

WithTrupe Barlaventina
Lendas do País do Sul (Legens of the South of the Country), 1999
O perfume da palavra (Word Perfumes)

Poetic works
Grande Angular (Great Angle), 2000
Toccata e Fuga (Toccata and Fugue), 2003

Notes

External links
Associação Música XXI (XXI Music Association) 

Year of birth missing (living people)
Living people
20th-century Portuguese male singers
20th-century Portuguese poets
Portuguese male stage actors
21st-century Portuguese male actors
21st-century Portuguese male singers
Portuguese male poets
Place of birth missing (living people)
21st-century Portuguese poets
20th-century male writers
21st-century male writers